The 2012–13 Georgian Cup (also known as the David Kipiani Cup) is the sixty-ninth season overall and the twenty-third since independence of the Georgian annual football tournament. The competition began on 29 August 2012 and will end with the final in May 2013. The defending champions are Dila Gori, after winning their first ever Georgian Cup last season. The winner of the competition will qualify for the second qualifying round of the 2013–14 UEFA Europa League.

As Dila Gori, Zestafoni, Metalurgi Rustavi and Torpedo Kutaisi are participating in Europe, they will join the competition in the round of 16.

Round of 32
The first legs were held on 29 and 30 August, with the return matches from the 17th to 19 September.

|}

First Legs

Second Legs

Round of 16
The draw for the round of 16 took place in the new year, with the 8 best-placed teams in the 2012–13 Umaglesi Liga in one pot and the remaining 8 teams in the other. The first legs were held on 26 February, with the return matches from 2 March.

|}

First Legs

Second Legs

Quarterfinals

The first legs will be held on 13 March, with the return matches from 10 April.

|}

First Legs

Second Legs

Semi-finals
The first legs were held on 23 April, with the return matches on 8 May.

|}

First Legs

Second Legs

Final

See also 
 2012–13 Umaglesi Liga
 2012–13 Pirveli Liga

References

External links
 Official site 

Georgian Cup seasons
Cup
Georgian Cup